WIOB (97.5 FM) is a radio station broadcasting a Spanish Tropical format. Licensed to Mayaguez, Puerto Rico, the station serves the Puerto Rico area. WIOB was founded in 1956 by Alfredo Ramírez de Arellano y Bartoli as WORA-FM, the first FM radio station established in Puerto Rico. The station is currently owned by Spanish Broadcasting System Holding Company, Inc. WIOB's programming is also heard on booster station, WIOB-FM1 in San Germán.

On February 1, 2018, WIOB left the Estereotempo Network after 41 years and switched to the repeater of the Zeta 93 Salsa Network.

References

External links

IOB
Spanish Broadcasting System radio stations
Radio stations established in 1956
IOB
1956 establishments in Puerto Rico